Rudy or Rudi is a masculine given name, sometimes short for Rudolf, Rudolph, Rawad, Rudra, Ruairidh, or variations thereof, a nickname and a surname which may refer to:

People

Given name or nickname
Rudolf Rudy Andeweg (born 1952), Dutch political scientist
Rudolf Rudi Assauer (1944–2019), German football manager and player
Rudolf Rudy Ballieux (1930–2020), Dutch immunologist
Rudi Carrell (1934–2006), Dutch television entertainer 
Rudy Cerami (born 1988), American football player
Rudy D'Amico (born 1940), American National Basketball Association scout, and former college and professional basketball coach
Rudy Demotte (born 1963), Belgian politician
Rudi Dil, birth name of Ruud Gullit (born 1962), Dutch retired football manager and player
Rudi Dolezal (born 1958), Austrian film director and film producer
Rüdiger Rudi Dornbusch (1942–2002), German economist
Alfred Willi Rudolf Rudi Dutschke (1940–1979), the most prominent spokesperson of the 1960s German student movement
Rudy Florio (born 1950), Canadian football player
Jonathan Rudy Ford (born 1994), American football player
Val Rudy Galindo (born 1969), American retired figure skater
Rudi Garcia (born 1964), French football manager and former player
Rudy Gay (born 1986), American basketball player
Rudolf Rudi Gernreich (1922–1985), Austrian-born American fashion designer
Rudolph Rudy Giuliani (born 1944) former US Associate Attorney General and former Mayor of New York City
Rudy Gobert (born 1992), French basketball player
Rudy Haddad (born 1985), French-Israeli football player
Rudy Horn (1933–2018), German juggler
Rudy Kennedy (1927–2008), British rocket scientist and Holocaust survivor and activist
Rudolph Rudy LaRusso (1937–2004), American basketball player
Rudy Linka (born 1960), Czech-American jazz guitarist
Rudy Pankow (born 1998), American actor 
Daniel "Rudy" Ruettiger (born 1948), American football player, motivational speaker, and inspiration for the film Rudy
Rudolph Rudy Sikich (1921–1998), American National Football League player
Rudolf Rudi Skácel (born 1979), Czech footballer
Rudy Trouvé (born 1967), Belgian musician
Hubert Rudy Vallée (1901–1986), American singer, actor and bandleader, one of the first modern pop stars
Rudolf Rudi Vis (1941–2010), Dutch-born British politician and Member of Parliament
Rudolf Rudi Völler (born 1960), German retired football manager and player
Rudolf Vrba (1924–2006), Slovak-Jewish biochemist, Auschwitz concentration camp escapee who co-wrote a report of the mass murders being committed there
Rudi Widodo (born 1983), Indonesian footballer
Rudolph Rudy Wiedoeft (1893–1940), American saxophonist
Preston Rudolph Rudy York (1913–1970), American Major League Baseball player
Rudi Ying (born 1998), Chinese ice hockey player
Albert Rudolph (1928–1973), American entrepreneur and Hindu spiritual teacher

Alias or stage name
Rudy (footballer), Angolan footballer born Carlos Wilson Cachicote da Rocha (born 1989)
Rudi Carrell, Dutch entertainer born Rudolf Wijbrand Kesselaar (1934–2006)
Rudy de Mérode, real name Frédéric Martin (1905–?), French collaborator in the Second World War
Rudy Grayzell, stage name of American rockabilly musician Rudolph Paiz Jimenez (1933–2019)

Surname
Andrzej Rudy (born 1965), Polish footballer
Florian Rudy (born 1989), German footballer
Gherasim Rudi (1907–1982), Prime Minister of the Moldovan SSR
Henry Rudi (1889–1970), Norwegian huntsman and polar bear hunter
Joe Rudi (born 1946), American former Major League Baseball player
Michał Radziwiłł Rudy (1870–1950), German-Polish diplomat and nobleman
Mikhail Rudy (born 1953), Russian-French pianist
Rajiv Pratap Rudy (born 1962), Indian politician
Ruth Rudy (born 1938), American politician
Sebastian Rudy (born 1990), German footballer
Steven Rudy (born 1978), American politician and businessman

Fictional characters
 Rudy,  Abby's stepbrother on Sesame Street. He is performed by Frankie Cordero. 
 Rudy, from The Book Thief
 Rudi van DiSarzio, a psychedelic monk in The Mighty Boosh
Rudi Gunn, in the Dirk Pitt adventure novels by novelist Clive Cussler
Rudeus Greyrat, the main character of the Japanese light novel Mushoku Tensei
Rudy Huxtable, in the American sitcom The Cosby Show
Rudy Jones, the best-known incarnation of the Parasite (comics), a DC Comics villain
Rudy Pipilo, a gangster in the American drama series The Deuce
Rudy Wade, in the British science fiction TV series Misfits
Rudy Wells, a scientist in the American TV series The Six Million Dollar Man
Rudy (Pokémon), in season two of the Pokémon anime
Rudy, in the 2009 animated film Ice Age: Dawn of the Dinosaurs
R.U.D.I, George Jetson's work computer in the animated TV series The Jetsons
Baron Rudi, in Austrian humor
Rudy Ransom, a Starfleet captain in an episode of Star Trek: Voyager ("Equinox (Star Trek: Voyager)")
Regular-Sized Rudy (born Rudolph Stieblitz), a supporting character in the animated series Bob's Burgers

Arts, entertainment, and media

Film
 Rudy (film), a 1993 American biographical sports film directed by David Anspaugh and starring Sean Astin.
 Rudy: The Rudy Giuliani Story, a 2003 American television film starring James Woods as former New York City mayor Rudy Giuliani.

See also
 Rudolph (name)
 Jan Bytnar nom de guerre "Rudy"

Masculine given names
Hypocorisms
English masculine given names
Surnames from given names